Ocaina is an indigenous American language spoken in western South America.

Classification
Ocaina belongs to the Witotoan language family.  It is its own group within the Huitoto-Ocaina sub-family.

Geographic distribution
Ocaina is spoken by 54 people in northeastern Peru and by 12 more in the Amazonas region of Colombia.  Few children speak the language.

Dialects/Varieties
There are two dialects of Ocaina: Dukaiya and Ibo'tsa.

Phonology

Consonants

Vowels

Tone

Syllables
Syllables in Ocaina consist of a vowel; single consonants may appear on either side of the vowel: (C)V(C).

Writing System
Ocaina is written using a Latin alphabet.  A chart of symbols with the sounds they represent is as follows:

Because the Ocaina alphabet is based on Spanish, c is used to indicate  before a, o, and u, qu is used before e and i, and k is used in loan words, such as  "kerosene".
Nasalization is indicated by inserting n after a vowel.  Compare:    "hang it" vs.   "clean it".
High tone is indicated with the acute accent: á, é, í, ó, ú.

References

Witotoan languages
Languages of Peru
Languages of Colombia

es:Ocaina